The Institute of Philosophy (Dutch: Hoger Instituut voor Wijsbegeerte) is the faculty of philosophy at the KU Leuven in the Belgian city of Leuven. It was founded in 1968 when the Institut supérieur de Philosophie - Hoger Instituut voor Wijsbegeerte of the Catholic University of Leuven (1835–1968) was split into a Dutch-speaking entity and a French-speaking entity. Its main buildings are located in the center of Leuven at the Kardinaal Mercier Square, named for the founder of the original institute.

History
The Institut supérieur de Philosophie was founded by Cardinal Mercier on 8 November 1889 with the intent to be a beacon of Neo-Thomist philosophy, although Philosophy and Theology have been taught at the universities of Leuven since 1425. The institute initially taught programs in French and started courses in Dutch in 1933. After the language split of 1968, the Hoger Instituut voor Wijsbegeerte became part of the newly independent Katholieke Universiteit te Leuven, offering programmes in Dutch with little and at times no content taught in French, while the French-speaking Institut supérieur de Philosophie of the Université catholique de Louvain continued in the new city of Louvain-la-Neuve. In 1993, the institute became the faculty of philosophy.

Programs offered
The institute offers both taught and research degrees (B.A., M.A., MPhil and PhD) as well as pre-doc and post-doc programs, both in Dutch and English. Students can take classes in both languages if desired.

Departments
 Cultural Philosophy
 Ethics, Social and Political Philosophy
 Logic and Philosophy of Science
 Metaphysics and Modern Philosophy
 Ancient, Medieval and Renaissance Philosophy
 Phenomenology

Husserl-Archives Leuven
The Institute, together with its French-speaking counterpart in Louvain-la-Neuve, are well known as the home of the Husserl-Archives, the research center responsible for the publication of the philosophical work of Edmund Husserl. After the death of the founder of the phenomenological movement, fearing for the destruction of his Nachlass at the hands of the Nazis, Father Herman Van Breda (Franciscan), PhD student at the institute, saved Husserl's manuscripts, library and widow and smuggled them to Leuven via diplomatic channels.

Research and publications
It also organizes several major publication efforts, including the Husserliana (Husserl-Archives), the Aristoteles Latinus (De Wulf-Mansion centre), the Latin editions of Aristotle's works known to the medieval philosophers.

Numbers 
 Ranks 24th in the QS World Philosophy Rankings (2014)
 More than 30 lecturers and professors
 80 researchers in 5 departments
 more than 100 graduate students
 Circa 750 students (of which 50% international students)

Renowned emeriti
  (1868–1955)
  (1932–2015)
  (1911–1981)
 
 André Léonard
 Herman Van Rompuy
 Rudolf Bernet
  William Desmond

Guest researchers and lecturers
Internationally renowned professors who have lectured at the institute:

Étienne Gilson
Jacques Lacan
Paul Ricœur
Emmanuel Levinas
Maurice Merleau-Ponty
Jan Patočka 
Jacques Derrida
Jean-François Lyotard
Charles Hartshorne
Michel Foucault
Karl Popper
John Searle

P. F. Strawson
Umberto Eco
Roger Scruton
Donald Davidson
Martha Nussbaum
Richard Rorty
Bernard Williams
Ian Hacking
John Milbank
Don Cupitt

Notable former students
 Hans Lindahl, professor and former student
 Bruce Ellis Benson, professor, Wheaton College, USA
 Babette Babich (professor), professor of philosophy at Fordham University

 Thomas D. Carroll, priest and former student (PhD, and PhL) 
 Marin Gillis, professor and former student
 Marc Sebrecht, professor and former student
 Joseph J. Kockelmans, professor, Pennsylvania State University, USA
 Renee Kohler-Ryan, senior lecturer, The University of Notre Dame, Sydney, Australia
 Wha-Chul Son, professor, Handong Global University, Korea
 John Hymers, associate professor, La Salle University, Philadelphia, USA
 Tanya Loughead, Professor of Philosophy, Canisius College, Buffalo, NY, USA
 Richard Chung Kee Lee assistant professor, Hong Kong Baptist University
 Damian C. Ilodigwe lecturer in Philosophy, SS Peter & Paul Major Seminary, Ibadan, Nigeria
 Nikolaj Zunic associate professor, St. Jerome's University, Waterloo, Ontario, Canada
 Jeffrey Bloechl, associate professor, Boston College, USA
 Stephan Lake, associate professor, Trinity Christian College, IL, USA
 Jovino G. Miroy, associate professor, Ateneo de Manila University, Philippines
 Michael Newman, professor of art writing, Goldsmiths University of London, UK
 Stuart Rennie, associate professor, University of North Carolina at Chapel Hill, USA
 Jeb Bishop, musician (BA 1985)

See also
 Joseph Maréchal
 Split of the Catholic University of Leuven
  Journal of Philosophy (before 1961 spelt )

References

External links
  (English)
 Site of the Tijdschrift voor Filosofie
 Journal Ethische Perspectieven (NL) and Ethical Perspectives (EN)

KU Leuven
Education in Leuven
Educational institutions established in 1889
1889 establishments in Belgium
Philosophy departments